Maka Obolashvili (born 17 June 1975) is a retired Georgian track and field athlete, who specialized in the hammer throw and javelin throw during her career.

Achievements
All results regarding javelin throw, unless stated otherwise

External links

1975 births
Living people
Female javelin throwers from Georgia (country)
Hammer throwers from Georgia (country)
Female hammer throwers